The 1951 Hardin–Simmons Cowboys football team was an American football team that represented Hardin–Simmons University in the Border Conference during the 1951 college football season. In its eighth and final season under head coach Warren B. Woodson, the team compiled a 6–6 record (4–1 against conference opponents), tied for second place in the conference, and outscored opponents by a total of 272 to 216.

Four Hardin-Simmons players were named to the 1951 All-Border Conference football team: end Bill Cagle; halfback Frank Goode, quarterback Bob Hart, and offensive tackle Cush Holder.

Schedule

References

Hardin-Simmons
Hardin–Simmons Cowboys football seasons
Hardin-Simmons Cowboys football